FPHS may  refer to:

Schools 
 Fair Park High School, Shreveport, Louisiana, United States
 Falinge Park High School, Rochdale, England
 Fisher Park High School, Ottawa, Ontario, Canada
 Forest Park High School (disambiguation)
 Franklin Pierce High School, Midland, Washington, United States

Other uses 
 Fellow of the Philosophical Society (FPhS)

See also 
 FPH (disambiguation)